Paul Curran may refer to:

 Paul Curran (cyclist) (born 1961), British racing cyclist
 Paul Curran (director) (born 1965), Scottish opera director and administrator
 Paul Curran (association footballer) (born 1966), Northern Irish football manager and former player
 Paul Curran (Gaelic footballer), Irish Gaelic footballer who played for Dublin
 Sir Paul Curran (geographer) (born 1955), president of City, University of London
 Paul Curran (hurler) (born 1981), Irish hurling fullback
 Paul J. Curran (1933–2008), New York politician and corruption fighter